Buster Barnett (born November 24, 1958) is a former American football tight end who played four seasons in the National Football League (NFL) for the Buffalo Bills from 1981 to 1984.

Professional career
After playing college football for the Jackson State Tigers, Barnett was drafted by the Buffalo Bills in the eleventh round of the 1981 NFL draft with the 299th overall pick. He played four seasons with the Bills, recording a career total of 26 receptions for 236 yards, including one career touchdown reception during his rookie season.

Personal life
Barnett attended Noxubee County High School in Macon, Mississippi.

On July 17, 2015, Barnett's 58-year-old wife Sandra, a middle school special needs teacher, was kidnapped and murdered by Buster's previous mistress, 49-year-old Lisa Brown, who then committed suicide.

References

1958 births
Living people
Players of American football from Mississippi
American football tight ends
African-American players of American football
Jackson State Tigers football players
Buffalo Bills players
People from Macon, Mississippi
21st-century African-American people
20th-century African-American sportspeople